Egle is a genus of willow catkin flies in the family Anthomyiidae. There are at least 40 described species in Egle.

Species
These 48 species belong to the genus Egle:

E. acicularis Griffiths, 2003 c g
E. agilis (Robineau-Desvoidy, 1830) c
E. anderssoni Michelsen, 2009 g
E. arctophila Griffiths, 2003 c g
E. asiatica Hennig, 1976 c g
E. atomaria (Zetterstedt, 1845) i c g
E. bicaudata (Malloch, 1920) i c g
E. brevicornis (Zetterstedt, 1838) i c g
E. ciliata (Walker, 1849) i c g
E. claripennis (Robineau-Desvoidy, 1830) c
E. communis (Robineau-Desvoidy, 1830) c g
E. concomitans (Pandellé, 1900) i c g
E. cyrtacra Fan & Wang, 1982 c g
E. exigua (Robineau-Desvoidy, 1830) c g
E. falcata Ackland & Griffiths, 2003 c g
E. festiva (Robineau-Desvoidy, 1830) c g
E. flavescens (Robineau-Desvoidy, 1830) c g
E. floricola (Robineau-Desvoidy, 1830) c
E. florum (Robineau-Desvoidy, 1830) c g
E. gracilior Zheng & Fan, 1990 c g
E. ignobilis Michelsen, 2009 g
E. inermis Ackland, 1970 c g
E. inermoides Michelsen, 2009 g
E. korpokkur Suwa, 1974 c g
E. longipalpis (Malloch, 1924) i c g
E. lyneborgi Ackland & Griffiths, 2003 c g
E. minuta (Meigen, 1826) i c g
E. myricariae Grossmann, 1998 c g
E. nigra (Robineau-Desvoidy, 1830) g
E. nitida (Robineau-Desvoidy, 1830) c g
E. pallipes (Robineau-Desvoidy, 1830) c g
E. parva Robineau-Desvoidy, 1830 c g
E. parvaeformis Schnabl, 1911 i c g
E. pilitibia (Ringdahl, 1918) i c g
E. podulparia Suh & Kwon, 1985 c g
E. polychaeta Griffiths, 2003 c g
E. protuberans Griffiths, 2003 c g
E. pseudosteini Griffiths, 2003 c g
E. pulverulentus (Robineau-Desvoidy, 1830) c g
E. rectapica Ge & Fan, 1981 c g
E. rhinotmeta (Pandellé, 1900) c g
E. setiapicis (Huckett, 1965) i c g
E. steini Schnabl, 1911 i c g
E. subarctica (Huckett, 1965) i c g
E. suwai Michelsen, 2009 g
E. tantilla Ackland, 1970 c g
E. viridescens (Robineau-Desvoidy, 1830) c g
E. washburni Griffiths, 2003 c g

Data sources: i = ITIS, c = Catalogue of Life, g = GBIF, b = Bugguide.net

References

Further reading

External links

 

Anthomyiidae
Articles created by Qbugbot
Schizophora genera